Jarava Lal Mehta (1912 – 11 July 1988) was an Indian philosopher, an expert on the philosophy of Martin Heidegger.

Bibliography
 Philosophy of Martin Heidegger, Harper & Row, 1971
 Martin Heidegger: the Way and the Vision, The University Press of Hawaii, 1976
 Advanced study in the history of medieval India, Sterling Publishing House Pvt Ltd, 1981
 India and the West: The Problem of Understanding, Scholars Press, 1985
 J.L. Mehta on Heidegger, Hermeneutics and Indian Tradition, edited by William J. Jackson, Brill Academic Pub, 1992
 Philosophy and religion: Essays in interpretation, Indian Council of Philosophical Research and Munshiram Manoharlal Publishers, 1990
 A history of the Panjab University, Chandigarh (1947-1967), with R. R. Sethi, Panjab University Publication Bureau, 1968
 Kavikarma aura cintana: Sarjana ke do ayama (Hirananda Shastri vyakhyanamala) (Hindi Edition), National Publishing House, New Delhi 1986

References

Further reading
 On the Death of the Pilgrim: The Postcolonial Hermeneutics of Jarava Lal Mehta (Sophia Studies in Cross-cultural Philosophy of Traditions and Cultures, Vol. 3), Thomas B. Ellis, Springer, 2012

Hermeneutists
Phenomenologists
Continental philosophers
20th-century Indian philosophers
Existentialists
Philosophy academics
Harvard University faculty
Academic staff of Banaras Hindu University
Banaras Hindu University alumni
University of Hawaiʻi faculty
1912 births
Heidegger scholars
1988 deaths
20th-century Indian historians